Dittsche: Das wirklich wahre Leben (The really real life) is a German improvisation comedy television show starring Olli Dittrich and Jon Flemming Olsen.

Olli Dittrich plays the unemployed Dittsche, who frequents a local fast food diner and converses with the proprietor about current events, drawing heavily on bizarre tabloid headlines to formulate perplexingly insane theories about their background. Schildkröte (German word for turtle), a bar regular (played by Franz Jarnach), looks on mostly passively in the background.

The show is unscripted and is broadcast live from a real fast food diner in Hamburg. One special feature of the show is the camera perspective, which changes in a fixed pattern and is digitally processed to mimic surveillance cameras. The show also features many celebrities from German TV and sports, who appear as customers of the diner.

Sources 

www.wdr.de

German comedy television series
2004 German television series debuts
2010s German television series
Television shows set in Hamburg
German-language television shows
Das Erste original programming
Grimme-Preis for fiction winners